Highway Hi-Fi was a system of proprietary players and seven-inch phonograph records with standard LP center holes designed for use in automobiles. Designed and developed by Peter Goldmark, who also developed the LP microgroove, the discs utilized 135 grams of vinyl each, enough to press a standard 10-inch LP (12-inch LPs of the period commonly used 160 grams of vinyl each and 45s used roughly 70 grams).

History 

The system appeared in Chrysler automobiles from 1955 to 1959 (1956-1959 model years). Records for the system were manufactured exclusively by Columbia Special Products, and could hold roughly 45 minutes of music or an hour of speech per side. This was accomplished by the use of a lower rotation speed of  rpm—versus   rpm for conventional long-playing records and 45 rpm for singles—in conjunction with an extremely tight groove pitch of 550 grooves per inch (216.5 grooves per centimeter, over four times that of a standard monaural LP of the period) and an extremely small ultra-microgroove width of only , roughly one-third the groove width of a standard stereo LP at 0.7 mils.

Demonstration discs and musical selections where high fidelity near the center was an issue were manufactured with standard  labels.

Manufacture 

The players themselves were manufactured by CBS Electronics. According to the official Chrysler press release of September 12, 1955, "Highway Hi-Fi plays through the speaker of the car radio and uses the radio's amplifier system. The turntable for playing records, built for Chrysler by CBS-Columbia, is located in a shock-proof case mounted just below the center of the instrument panel. A tone arm, including sapphire stylus and ceramic pick up, plus storage space for six long-play records make up the unit." A button controlled whether you listened to the radio or the records.

Highway Hi-Fi units were factory-installed and were not available as aftermarket add-ons.	With a tendency to break or malfunction, and a limited number of titles (which were available solely from one label's back catalog), the product was not a commercial success; Chrysler slowly began to pull support for Highway Hi-Fi as early as 1957 when high warranty service costs became evident. Another automobile record player was manufactured by RCA from 1960 to 1961. This later version dropped the "Highway Hi-Fi" label (not being Chrysler-exclusive) and played standard 45-rpm  records. It, too, suffered a short lifespan: the players were even more prone to malfunction than those manufactured by CBS, and standard 7-inch records had their grooves worn down rapidly by the high stylus pressure used to prevent skipping.

Notes

References 

 Goldmark, Peter. Maverick Inventor:My Turbulent Years at CBS. Saturday Review Press, 1973.
 Greenfield, Jack. Practical Auto Radio Service and Installation. Gernsback Library Inc., 1960.

External links 
 Automotive Oddities
 Highway Hi-Fi at Ook's World
 1956 to 1959 Columbia "Highway Hi-Fi"  rpm Record Players

Chrysler
Audio storage
Audio equipment manufacturers of the United States
American inventions
Phonograph manufacturers